Kyle Pfeiffer (born June 9, 1990), better known by his stage name Blacklite District, is an American rock music artist. Raised in Indiana, Pfeiffer moved to Spearfish, South Dakota at a young age. Before taking the name as his own, Blacklite District was previously a band comprised by Pfeiffer and Roman James. Blacklite District has four songs which have reached Top 40 on the Billboard Mainstream Rock Airplay chart.

Early life 

Kyle Pfeiffer was born on June 9, 1990, and grew up in Indiana before moving to South Dakota at a young age. As both of his parents struggled with drug addiction, Pfeiffer was raised by his grandparents.

On May 3, 1999, his mother passed away from a heroin overdose at the age of 27. Shortly after, Pfeiffer began listening to artists like Ozzy Osbourne, as an escape from the trauma of losing a parent at such a young age. He claims Ozzy Osbourne as his biggest musical influence and for getting him started on the path to a career in music.

At the age of 10, Pfeiffer's grandfather bought him a drum-set from a Sears catalog after he started listening to Fleetwood Mac. He learned to play drums by himself by watching VHS tapes of live concerts. Eventually, he rediscovered and became obsessed with Ozzy Osbourne's band, Black Sabbath, and that is when he started taking singing seriously, and writing his own songs.

In high school, Pfeiffer played music with his friends and started a band in 2004. He graduated from Spearfish High School in 2009.

Career

Blacklite District (2011–2022) 
In early 2011, Pfeiffer met producer Stephen Short, who signed him and Roman James, another artist in the Black Hills, to a production deal. The two formed the band Blacklite District, with James as vocalist and Pfeiffer as guitarist, and released their debut extended play This Is Where It Ends (2011). In 2012, they relocated to Los Angeles and then to Florida after signing with Silent Majority Group. They promoted the With Me Now EP (2013) on tour with the bands Saving Abel and Art of Dying and released their debut album Worldwide Controversy the following year. Their first charting single "With Me Now" came from the album, peaking #34 on the Billboard Mainstream Rock Airplay chart in 2013. Pfeiffer considers the singles "With Me Now" and “Take Me To The Grave” as a "turning point" for the band.

After two years, Blacklite District released their second album To Whom It May Concern (2016). Pfeiffer shifted to vocals and the album leaned more towards hip hop and pop. The single "Cold as Ice" from Pfeiffer's album Instant Gratification (2017) became viral and reached #35 on Mainstream Rock Airplay in January 2018. The song also had a Minecraft music video created by the YouTuber Rainimator, which was released in August 2017 and has over 50 million views. The success of "Cold as Ice" led Pfeiffer to adapt Blacklite District as his own stage name, as James was now both a collaborator and a solo artist under the stage name R8eDR.

Solo career, You're Welcome and 1990 (2018–present) 
In 2018, Pfeiffer became a solo act. As a solo artist, Pfeiffer released "Hard Pill to Swallow", which was premiered by Billboard in October 2018. The song went on to get over 10 million combined streams. In January 2019, "1 of a Kind" was released as the second single from the band's limited edition release Through the Ages. 

In 2020, Pfeiffer released the LPs Blacklite District and You're Welcome. The single "Falling" from You're Welcome was then highest-charting single to date.

"Gotta Get Outta Here" was released on October 1 as the lead single from Pfeiffer's "1990" album, which was released on December 31, 2021. The song spent 16 weeks in the top-40 of the Billboard Mainstream Rock chart, and garnered over 10 million combined streams and video views as of November 2022. 

In mid 2022, Pfeiffer announced that original drummer Graham Spillman would be returning to record drums on the five bonus tracks on 1990 - XL, which led to Spillman being named as the permanent drummer for Blacklite District moving forward. 

In November of the same year, Pfeiffer and Spillman entered the studio with long-time producer Brett Hestla, and new guitarist Justin Sundlin, to record new "XL" songs for the upcoming 'Blacklite District - XL' album in 2023. 1990 - XL was released on November 11, 2022.

Artistry 
Pfeiffer's genres include "hard rock, hip-hop, alternative rock, trap, and electro-pop". Inspired by artists he listened to as a child, such as Metallica and Ozzy Osbourne, Pfeiffer started out as a hard rock artist but has, in recent years, incorporated a variety of genres in his music. In a 2018 interview, Pfeiffer named artists like Fleetwood Mac, Linkin Park and Twenty One Pilots as influences. His album 1990 (2021) marked a return to hard rock.

Personal life 

Pfeiffer began dating Amber Rice in September 2015, and the two were married two years later in December 2017. They raise Pfeiffer's son, Maddox, from a previous relationship. He proposed to Amber during a New Year's Eve concert in his hometown of Spearfish, SD.

Pfeiffer has lived in multiple cities during his time breaking into the music industry. He moved to Los Angeles area in 2012, and still visits there frequently to record and shoot music videos. He also lived in Orlando, FL for about six months while working with producer Brett Hestla on some early recordings. At one time, he was managed by Jeff Hanson, who was also in the Orlando area.

In 2015–2017, Pfeiffer was hospitalized on multiple occasions for alcohol-induced pancreatitis from years of alcohol abuse on the road, which led to a full-blown addiction at home. As of January 2020, Pfeiffer has been clean from alcohol for over a year and lives a sober lifestyle.

In January 2020, Pfeiffer and his wife Amber officially formed AK19 Entertainment as an LLC.

Chart History 

Billboard US charting:

 "With Me Now" (2014) - No. 34 Mainstream Rock Songs
 "Cold As Ice" (2018) - No. 35 Mainstream Rock Songs
 "Falling" (2020) - No. 33 Mainstream Rock Songs
 "Gotta Get Outta Here" (2022) – No. 31 Mainstream Rock Songs

Discography 

Studio Albums
 Blacklite District [2020] - AK19 Entertainment, LLC
 You're Welcome [2020] - AK19 Entertainment, LLC
 You're Welcome (Deluxe Edition) [2021]
 1990 [2021] - AK19 Entertainment, LLC
 1990 - XL [11.11.22] - AK19 Ent, LLLC
 Blacklite District - XL [TBA 2023] - AK19 Ent, LLC
 You're Welcome - XL [TBA 2023] - AK19 Ent, LLC

References

External links 
Official website

American hard rock musicians
Singers from South Dakota
Rappers from South Dakota
1990 births
Living people